European route E 603 is a European B class road in France, connecting the cities Saintes and Limoges.

Route 
 
 E602 Saintes
 E606 Angoulême
 E09 Limoges

External links 
 UN Economic Commission for Europe: Overall Map of E-road Network (2007)
 International E-road network

Roads in France